Flewelling is a surname. Notable people with the surname include:
 Gabriel Flewelling (1842–1922), Canadian politician
 Lynn Flewelling (born 1958), American writer
 Ralph Tyler Flewelling (1871–1960), American philosopher and academic
 William P. Flewelling (1814–1875), Canadian politician